Hugh Robinson may refer to:
Hugh Robinson (aviator) (1881–1963), American aviation pioneer
Hugh Robinson (painter) (1756–1796), British painter
Hugh Malcolm Robinson (1857–1933), British factory inspector